Taghandik (also Romanized as Taghāndik and Taqāndik; also known as Taghandak) is a village in Momenabad Rural District, in the Central District of Sarbisheh County, South Khorasan Province, Iran. At the 2006 census, its population was 102, in 29 families.

References 

Populated places in Sarbisheh County